A Man's Affair is a 1949 British comedy film directed by Jay Lewis and starring Hamish Menzies, Cliff Gordon and Diana Decker. It was made as a second feature, and released by Exclusive Films. Both Lewis and most of his crew were former members of the Army Kinematograph Service.

The film portrays a pair of coal miners who meets some holidaying girls in the Kent resort of Ramsgate.

Cast
 Hamish Menzies as Jim  
 Cliff Gordon as Ted  
 Diana Decker as Sheila 
 Joan Dowling as Joan 
 Wallas Eaton as Leonard  
 Joyce Linden as Phyl  
 Toke Townley as Mike  
 Verne Morgan as Sidney  
 D.L. Davies as Evan Davies  
 Malcolm Thomas as Joe Davies  
 Jack Vyvian as George  
 Farnham Baxter as Herbert  
 David Keir as Curly  
 Peter Lewis as Ernie  
 Pat Nye as Mrs. Mustard

References

Bibliography
 Chibnall, Steve & McFarlane, Brian. The British 'B' Film. Palgrave MacMillan, 2009.
 Palmer, Scott. British Film Actors' Credits, 1895-1987. McFarland, 1998.

External links

1949 films
British comedy films
1949 comedy films
Films directed by Jay Lewis
Films set in Kent
British black-and-white films
1940s English-language films
1940s British films